Cedille Records is the independent record label of the Chicago Classical Recording Foundation.

History
In 1989, James Ginsburg, the son of U.S. Supreme Court Associate Justice Ruth Bader Ginsburg, founded Cedille Records as a for-profit classical music recording company featuring Chicago-area musicians. Ginsburg's vision for Cedille was "to record local musicians overlooked by the major labels." Cedille is the only Chicago-based classical label since Mercury Living Presence in the 1950s. In 1994, Cedille was transformed into a not-for-profit record label under the umbrella of the Chicago Classical Recording Foundation.

The label's releases included The Pulitzer Project, an album featuring Chicago's Grant Park Symphony Orchestra which includes two world premier recordings: William Schuman's "A Free Song" (Pulitzer 1943) and  Leo Sowerby's "Canticle of the Sun" (Pulitzer 1946).

Awards and honors
Several CDs released on the label have won or been nominated for Grammy Awards. In 2004 Brahms & Joachim Violin Concertos was nominated for the Grammy Award for Best Engineered Album, Classical and in 2005 Robert Kurka Symphonic Works was nominated in the same category. In 2008 the ensemble eighth blackbird won the Grammy Award for Best Chamber Music Performance for their album strange imaginary animals. In the same year, Judith Sherman won the Grammy Award for Producer of the Year, Classical for her work with the label. strange imaginary animals was included among her production credits along with  Jennifer Koh's album String Poetic, which was nominated in the Best Chamber Music Performance category in the same year. In 2009, Ursula Oppens' album Oppens Plays Carter was nominated for Best Instrumental Soloist Performance (without orchestra) in 2009. Most of those nominated for Grammy Awards and an additional thirty-one albums released on the label have received Classics Today's highest rating, 10/10.

The song "Nulla in Mundo Pax Sincera" from A Vivaldi Concert was featured in the documentary Pale Male, an episode of the documentary series Nature on PBS.

Roster
 Dmitry Paperno
 Easley Blackwood, Jr.
 David Schrader
 Kim Scholes
 Rembrandt Chamber Players
 Patrice Michaels
 Georgia Mangos and Louise Mangos
 Chicago Symphony Orchestra
 Boston Symphony Orchestra
 Vermeer Quartet
 John Bruce Yeh
 Chicago Chamber Musicians
 Chicago Baroque Ensembles
 Paul Freeman
 Rachel Barton Pine
 Czech National Symphony Orchestra
 Joyce Castle
 Chicago Opera Theater
 Encore Chamber Orchestra
 His Majestie's Clerkes
 Patrick Sinozich
 Alex Klein
 Mary Stolper
 Wendy Warner
 Chicago Pro Musica
 Pacifica Quartet
 Nancy Gustafson
 Cathy Basrak
 Chicago Sinfonietta
 Prague Chamber Chorus
 Gaudete Brass Quintet
 Michael Tree
 Jennifer Koh
 Grant Park Orchestra
 New Budapest Orpheum Society
 eighth blackbird
 Amelia Trio
 Recho Uchida
 Jorge Federico Osorio
 Mathieu Dufour
 Charles Pickler
 Gary Stucka
 Scottish Chamber Orchestra
 Orion Ensemble
 Elizabeth Buccheri
 Cavatina Duo
 Matthew Hagle
 Trio Settecento
 Biava Quartet
 Lincoln Trio
 William Ferris Chorale
 Composer Festival Orchestra
 Richard Young
 Ricardo Castro
 Jennifer Larmore
 Royal Philharmonic Orchestra
 Chicago a cappella
 Ursula Oppens
 Chicago Children's Choir
 Baroque Band
 Beethoven Project Trio
 Jerome Lowenthal
 Irina Nuzova
 Kuang Hao-Huang
 New Brandenburg Collegium

See also
 List of record labels

References

External links
 Official website
 Inside Publications profile of Cedille Records and James Ginsberg (2004)

Record labels established in 1989
American independent record labels
Companies based in Chicago
Classical music record labels